Charlotte Blakeney Ward (1873–1962) was an English artist, best known as a portrait painter. She worked in several media and genres, and is known to have exhibited between 1898 and 1939.

She was born in Eccles, Lancashire, the daughter of the journalist James Blakeney, a journalist. She was educated privately at home, and later studied at the Royal College of Art. She also studied in Paris, and exhibited at the Paris Salon of 1900.

She married a fellow portrait artist, Charles Daniel Ward. Her portrait subjects included the suffragist Mary Collin, the poet Robinson Jeffers, and several members of the nobility. Her work was exhibited at the Royal Academy.

In 1923 she became President of the Society of Women Artists, having been vice-president since 1917, and held the presidency until 1931.

References

1873 births
1962 deaths
English painters